Aalay Pathu Malai Mathu is a 1990 Indian Tamil-language film, written and directed by M. Venkat Vasu and produced by A. K. Kuppu Raj. It stars Nizhalgal Ravi, Chandrasekhar, Madhuri and Radha Ravi .

Cast 
 Nizhalgal Ravi
 Chandrasekhar
 Bhagya
 Madhuri
 Radha Ravi
 Senthil
 Malaysia Vasudevan
 Charle
 Jayamalini
 Kovai Sarala
 Vijaya Chandrika
 Sonia

Music
The music was composed by Shankar–Ganesh, while lyrics were written by Vairamuthu, Muthulingam, Ganesh and "Karaikudi" Venkatesh. All songs were well received by the audience.

References

1990 films
1990s Tamil-language films
Films scored by Shankar–Ganesh